The VfB Eichstätt is a German association football club from the town of Eichstätt, Bavaria. Since 2017 it plays in the Regionalliga Bayern, the fourth tier of the German football league system and the highest league in Bavaria.

The club's greatest success came in 2019 when it was runners-up in the Regionalliga Bayern and the Bavarian amateur champion, which qualified the club for the DFB-Pokal.

History 

VfB Eichstätt was formed on 1 August 1920 with an initial membership of 90 people.

For most of its history the club has been a non-descript amateur side in local Bavarian football. The club spent considerable time in the local A-Klasse, briefly moving up to the Bezirksliga above in the late 1970s. However, by 1991 VfB dropped to the lowest level of play in the region, the C-Klasse, and remained there for seven seasons. The club began to rise through the league system in the early 2000s, winning the tier seven Bezirksliga Oberbayern-Nord and earning promotion to the Bezirksoberliga Oberbayern in 2006. After two second-place finishes in 2007 and 2008 VfB won this league in 2009 and earned another promotion, now to the Landesliga Bayern-Süd.

In its first Landesliga season the club was a strong contender for another promotion but, after finishing first on equal points with SV Heimstetten, lost a championship decider and then also failed in the promotion round. The second year in the league proved much harder with VfB struggling against relegation and coming only 14th. The third year in the Landesliga, the final season of the Landesliga Süd before it was disbanded, the club came fourth.

The fourth place in the Landesliga in 2011–12 allowed VfB Eichstätt direct qualification for the Bayernliga, where it came ninth in its first year and fourth the season after. After a less successful 2014–15 season the club was moved to the northern division of the Bayernliga for the following one.

In 2016–17 VfB Eichstätt was champion of the northern division of the Bayernliga. Following that the club was promoted to Regionalliga Bayern. At the end of its first season in Regionalliga Bayern the club reached the seventh place. The second season, they were second, behind Bayern Munich II, and qualified for the DFB-Pokal, in which they lost 5–1 in the first round to Hertha Berlin.

Current squad

Honours 

The club's honours:

 Champions of C-Klasse: 1999
 Champions of B-Klasse: 2000
 Champions of A-Klasse: 1936, 1948
 Champions of Kreisliga: 1974, 2002
 Champions of Bezirksliga Oberbayern-Nord: 2006
 Champions of Bezirksoberliga Oberbayern: 2009
 Champions of Bayernliga Nord: 2017
 Bavarian amateur champions: 2019

Recent seasons 

The recent season-by-season performance of the club:

With the introduction of the Bezirksoberligas in 1988 as the new fifth tier, below the Landesligas, all leagues below dropped one tier. With the introduction of the Regionalligas in 1994 and the 3. Liga in 2008 as the new third tier, below the 2. Bundesliga, all leagues below dropped one tier. With the establishment of the Regionalliga Bayern as the new fourth tier in Bavaria in 2012 the Bayernliga was split into a northern and a southern division, the number of Landesligas expanded from three to five and the Bezirksoberligas abolished. All leagues from the Bezirksligas onwards were elevated one tier.

References

External links 

 Official team site  
 Das deutsche Fußball-Archiv  historical German domestic league tables
 Manfreds Fussball Archiv  Tables and results from the Bavarian amateur leagues
 VfB Eichstätt at Weltfussball.de 

Football clubs in Germany
Football clubs in Bavaria
Football in Upper Bavaria
Association football clubs established in 1920
1920 establishments in Germany
Eichstätt